Hunter Wayne Reynolds (July 30, 1959–June 12, 2022) was an American visual artist, and AIDS activist. He was known for his performance art and protest, and he was an early member of the AIDS activism group ACT UP. In 1989, he co-founded ART + Positive. Charles Sanchez of POZ wrote "His work is profound, beautiful, at times startling and always ferociously honest."

Biography 
Hunter Wayne Reynolds was born on July 30, 1959 in Rochester, Minnesota. His parents were Danielle (née Dusseau) and Robert Reynolds. Around 1966 his parents divorced and he moved to Florida, followed by a move to California. 

He attended Otis College of Art and Design (formerly Otis Art Institute of Parsons School of Design) and received a B.F.A. degree in 1984. After graduation he moved to New York City and founded ART + Positive, an ACT UP affinity group which protested for AIDS. 

Around 1989 he was diagnosed with HIV. After his diagnosis he created a drag persona "Patina du Prey", who wore full ball gowns. It was through this persona he worked as a performance artist for many years. In 2017, he was a Guggenheim fellow.

Reynolds died of squamous cell carcinoma on June 12, 2022 in New York City, at the age of 62.

References

External links 
 Oral history interview with Hunter Reynold, Archives of American Art

1959 births
2022 deaths
People from Rochester, Minnesota
21st-century American artists
Members of ACT UP
American LGBT artists
Otis College of Art and Design alumni
American activists
Deaths from cancer in New York (state)